Obične ljubavne pjesme is the third album of the Croatian rock band Aerodrom, released through Jugoton in 1982. This is the first album that introduces Jurica Pađen as a lead vocal, what he will remain until today. The album contains their greatest single until then, "Obična ljubavna pjesma", which brings the band national success.

Track listing
All lyrics written by Jurica Pađen, all arrangements by Aerodrom and Tini Varga

Personnel 
Aerodrom
Jurica Pađen – Guitars, lead vocals
Remo Cartagine – Bass, backup vocals
Zoran Kraš – Keyboards, backup vocals
Branko Knežević – Drums, percussions, backup vocals

Additional musicians
Ulf Andersson – Saxophone
Tini Varga – Guitars, drum machine programming, effects, synthesizer, backup vocals

Artwork
Dražen Kalenić – Design

Production
Tini Varga – Producer
Recorded by Tini Varga

References

External links
 Official Youtube channel

Aerodrom (band) albums
1982 albums
Jugoton albums